Sundroj is a village in Khol Block of Rewari Tehsil, Rewari district, Gurgaon division, Haryana, India. Its  of the State capital, Chandigarh. Its postal head office is at Khori.

References

Villages in Rewari district